The Commonwealth Winter Games was a multi-sport event comprising winter sports, last held in 1966. Three editions of the Games have been staged. The Winter Games were designed as a counterbalance to the Commonwealth Games, which focuses on summer sports, to accompany the Winter Olympics and Summer Olympic Games.

History
The winter Games were founded by T.D. Richardson. The 1958 Commonwealth Winter Games were held in St. Moritz, Switzerland. This was the inaugural games for the winter edition. The 1962 Games were also held in St. Moritz, complementing the 1962 British Empire and Commonwealth Games in Perth, Australia, and the 1966 event was held in St. Moritz as well, following which the idea was discontinued.

A Winter Games was proposed for 2010 in India, complementing the 2010 Commonwealth Games in New Delhi. The proposed venue was Gulmarg in Jammu and Kashmir, where the Indian National Winter Games had previously been held, but the idea did not come to fruition.

List of Commonwealth Winter Games

Gallery

See also
Commonwealth Youth Games
Commonwealth Paraplegic Games
Winter Olympic Games
Asian Winter Games

References

External links
 Article in Outlook India.com
 Article in Kashmir World Press

Commonwealth Winter Games
Winter multi-sport events
Winter sports